Sinners in Paradise is a 1938 American south seas adventure film directed by James Whale and starring Madge Evans, John Boles, Bruce Cabot, Marion Martin and Gene Lockhart. In 1966, the film entered the public domain in the United States because the claimants did not renew its copyright registration in the 28th year after publication.

Plot
A passenger aircraft crashes in mid-Pacific and some of the survivors reach an island inhabited only by an American, Jim Taylor, with his Chinese servant, Ping. He declines to help them, telling them to build their own shelter and gather their own food and, though he has a boat and fuel, refusing to take them off. The reason why he wants to remain undisturbed, we learn, is that he is wanted for murder. In time his attitude to the intruders softens as they, despite endless bickering, manage to form a working community and he finds himself increasingly drawn to an attractive young nurse, Anne Wesson, who is running away from her husband. When the boat is prepared for a trip to civilization, two crooked businessmen from the party steal it with Ping on board. In a fight, he kills them both and, fatally wounded, brings the boat back. The rest can then escape.

Cast
 Madge Evans as Anne Wesson
 John Boles as Jim Taylor
 Bruce Cabot as Robert Malone aka The Torpedo
 Marion Martin as Iris Compton
 Gene Lockhart as Sen. Corey
 Charlotte Wynters as Thelma Chase
 Nana Bryant as Mrs. Franklin Sydney
 Milburn Stone as Honeyman
 Don 'Red' Barry as Jessup (as Donald Barry)
 Morgan Conway as Harrison Brand
 Willie Fung as Ping

See also
 Public domain film
 List of American films of 1938
 List of films in the public domain in the United States

References

External links

  Sinners in Paradise  on YouTube

Southseascinema.org

1938 films
1938 drama films
1930s English-language films
American black-and-white films
Films directed by James Whale
Universal Pictures films
American adventure drama films
1938 adventure films
1930s American films